The 1996 Brown Bears football team was an American football team that represented Brown University during the 1996 NCAA Division I-AA football season. Brown tied for third in the Ivy League. 

In their third season under head coach Mark Whipple, the Bears compiled a 5–5 record and were outscored 246 to 238. Brendan Finneran was the team captain. 

The Bears' 4–3 conference tied for third in the Ivy League standings. They outscored Ivy opponents 171 to 160. 

Brown played its home games at Brown Stadium in Providence, Rhode Island.

Schedule

References

Brown
Brown Bears football seasons
Brown Bears football